Thurman G. Adams Jr. (July 25, 1928 – June 23, 2009) was a Democratic member of the Delaware Senate, representing the 19th District. He was the longest-serving state senator in Delaware history, at the time of his death.

Biography
Adams was born in 1928 in Bridgeville, Delaware to Thurman and Bessie Lillian Adams. He was the youngest of four children, and grew up working on the farm during the Great Depression and World War II. He was educated in the public schools and graduated from the University of Delaware in 1950.

Death
On June 23, 2009, Adams died from pancreatic cancer at Kent General Hospital in Dover. He was 80 years old.

Legacy
The University of Delaware acquired the personal papers and collectible memorabilia of Adams in 2010. Items may be displayed as part of a special collection after review and processing.

The University of Delaware named its research and education farm in Georgetown, Delaware in honor of Adams. The research farm is named the Thurman G. Adams Agricultural Research Farm.

References

External links
2008 ***2006 2004 2002 2000 Follow the Money - Thurman Adams Jr. campaign contributions
University of Delaware: Library acquires papers of Thurman Adams Jr.

1928 births
2009 deaths
People from Bridgeville, Delaware
Democratic Party Delaware state senators
Deaths from pancreatic cancer
Deaths from cancer in Delaware
University of Delaware alumni
20th-century American politicians
American United Methodists
20th-century Methodists